Enter Deception is the debut full-length album by American power metal band Cellador.

Track listing 
"Leaving All Behind"  – 3:13
"A Sign Far Beyond"  – 5:17
"Never Again"  – 5:13
"Forever Unbound"  – 5:59
"Seen Through Time"  – 7:09
"Wakening"  – 5:19
"Releasing the Shadow"  – 5:42
"No Chances Lost"  – 6:31

Japanese edition bonus tracks 
9. "Forever Unbound" (demo version)
10. "No Chances Lost" (demo version)

Credits 
 Michael Gremio – vocals
 Chris Petersen – lead and rhythm guitar
 Bill Hudson – lead guitar
 Valentin Rakhmanov – bass
 David Dahir – drums and percussion

2006 albums
Cellador albums
Albums with cover art by Jean-Pascal Fournier